The 2022 AIR Awards is the sixteenth annual Australian Independent Record Labels Association Music Awards ceremony (generally known as the AIR Awards). It took place on 4 August 2022 in Adelaide.

The nominations were revealed on 18 May 2022 with all material being released in 2021.

Owusu won three awards from three nominations. In a video acceptance speech after winning Independent Album of the Year, Owusu said, "I poured everything that I had into the making of this album, simply for my own sanity and mental well-being, so the fact that it's being recognised by so many young people globally and industry-wise is insane to me. And I'm humble and grateful for it."

The late Warren Costello was honoured with the 2022 Outstanding Achievement Award, being recognised for his more than 30 years spent supporting independent artists and labels, including time spent as the managing director for Liberation Music.

Performances
Jesswar
Telenova
Teenage Joans
Jaguar Jonze
Andrew Swift
reference:

Nominees and winners

AIR Awards
Winners indicated in boldface, with other nominees in plain.

See also
Music of Australia

References

2022 in Australian music
2022 music awards
AIR Awards